Jill Sawyer aka Hotdog Sawyer is an American former competitive figure skater from Chagrin Falls, Ohio. She is the 1978 World Junior champion and the 1978 Prague Skate champion.

Sawyer trained in Tacoma, Washington, coached by Kathy Casey. As a 14-year-old, Sawyer drew attention for her ability to land the triple lutz, then a rare jump in ladies' singles.

In 1978, Sawyer won gold at the World Junior Championships and Prague Skate. She ceased competing soon after.

Competitive highlights

References

Navigation

American female single skaters
Living people
World Junior Figure Skating Championships medalists
Sportspeople from Tacoma, Washington
Year of birth missing (living people)
21st-century American women